The following lists events that happened during 1854 in New Zealand.

Population
The estimated population of New Zealand at the end of 1854 is 60,650 Māori and 32,554 non-Māori.

Incumbents

Regal and viceregal
Head of State – Queen Victoria
Governor – Sir George Grey resigns on 6 January. Colonel Thomas Gore Browne is appointed later in the year, but does not arrive to  take up his position until 6 September 1855.

Government and law
After New Zealand's first general election, held on 1 October 1853 the 1st Parliament opens on 24 May.

There is neither an official Prime Minister/Premier/Colonial Secretary or Finance Minister/Colonial Secretary in the government at this point in time.  (see 1st New Zealand Parliament)

Speaker of the House – When the 1st Parliament opens on 24 May Sir Charles Clifford is unanimously elected as New Zealand's first Speaker of the House.
Chief Justice – William Martin

Events 
 4 May:  The Māori language magazine, The Maori Messenger or Ko te Karere Maori, which started in 1849, stops publishing. In 1855 it will be revived with a different Māori title.
June:  The Canterbury Standard begins publication. The Christchurch newspaper continues until 1866.

Sport

Horse racing
2 December – The Canterbury Jockey Club is formed, the first club of its kind in New Zealand. It holds its first meeting, at Riccarton Racecourse, in 1855.

Births
15 February: Peter Webb, rugby union player
8 April: George Carter, rugby union player
11 May: Westby Perceval, politician (in Tasmania)  
11 December: James Edward Fulton, civil engineer 
12 December: Alfred Brandon, Mayor of Wellington.
 (unknown date): William Thomas Wood, politician

Deaths

 April: Robert Fyffe, whaler and runholder
 5 May: Te Ruki Kawiti, tribal leader
 23 June: John Deans, Christchurch pioneer
 19 October: Joseph Zillwood, policeman, farmer and innkeeper

Unknown date
Te Aitu-o-te-rangi Jury, tribal founding mother, landowner and farmer
Ngātata-i-te-rangi, tribal leader

See also
List of years in New Zealand
Timeline of New Zealand history
History of New Zealand
Military history of New Zealand
Timeline of the New Zealand environment
Timeline of New Zealand's links with Antarctica

References

External links